A voivodeship is the highest-level administrative division of Poland, corresponding to a province in many other countries. The term has been in use since the 14th century and is commonly translated into English as "province".

The Polish local government reforms adopted in 1998, which went into effect on 1 January 1999, created sixteen new voivodeships. These replaced the 49 former voivodeships that had existed from 1 July 1975, and bear a greater resemblance (in territory, but not in name) to the voivodeships that existed between 1950 and 1975.

Today's voivodeships are mostly named after historical and geographical regions, while those prior to 1998 generally took their names from the cities on which they were centered.

Etymology and use 
Some English-language sources, in historic contexts, speak of palatinates rather than voivodeships. The term "palatine" traces back to the Latin .

More commonly used now is province or voivodeship. The latter is a loanword-calque hybrid formed on the Polish .

Some writers argue against rendering  in English as province, on historic grounds. Before the third and last Partition of the Polish–Lithuanian Commonwealth, which occurred in 1795, each of the main constituent regions of the Polish–Lithuanian Commonwealth—Greater Poland, Lesser Poland, Lithuania, and Royal Prussia—was sometimes idiosyncratically referred to as a "Province". According to the argument, a province (such as Greater Poland) cannot consist of a number of subdivisions ("", the plural of "") that are likewise called "provinces". This is an antiquarian consideration, as " province" has not been used in this sense in Poland for over two centuries. The former larger political units, all now obsolete, can be referred to in English as they were, "regions".

The English voivodeship, which is a hybrid of the loanword voivode and -ship (the latter a suffix that calques the Polish suffix ), has never been much used and is absent from many dictionaries. According to the Oxford English Dictionary, it first appeared in 1792, spelled "woiwodship", in the sense of "the district or province governed by a voivode." The word subsequently appeared in 1886 also in the sense of "the office or dignity of a voivode."

Poland's Commission on Standardization of Geographic Names outside the Republic of Poland, prefers the form which omits the 'e', recommending the spelling "", for use in English.

Since 1999

Administrative powers 
Competences and powers at voivodeship level are shared between the voivode (governor), the sejmik (regional assembly) and the marshal. In most cases these institutions are all based in one city, but in Kuyavian-Pomeranian and Lubusz Voivodeship the voivode's offices are in a different city from those of the executive and the sejmik. Voivodeship capitals are listed in the table below.

The voivode is appointed by the Prime Minister and is the regional representative of the central government. The voivode acts as the head of central government institutions at regional level (such as the police and fire services, passport offices, and various inspectorates), manages central government property in the region, oversees the functioning of local government, coordinates actions in the field of public safety and environment protection, and exercises special powers in emergencies.

The  is elected every five years. The  passes by-laws, including the voivodeship's development strategies and budget.

List

Economies 

According to 2017 Eurostat data, the GDP per capita of Polish voivodeships varies notably and there is a large gap between the richest per capita voivodeship (being the Masovian Voivodeship at 33,500 EUR) and the poorest per capita (being the Lublin Voivodeship at 14,400 EUR).

Historical development

Polish–Lithuanian Commonwealth

Greater Poland (Wielkopolska) 
The following is a list of the Voivodeships within Greater Poland at various points over the period from the mid-16th century until the late 18th century:
 Poznań Voivodeship (województwo poznańskie, Poznań)
 Kalisz Voivodeship (województwo kaliskie, Kalisz)
 Gniezno Voivodeship (województwo gnieźnieńskie, Gniezno) from 1768
 Sieradz Voivodeship (województwo sieradzkie, Sieradz)
 Łęczyca Voivodeship (województwo łęczyckie, Łęczyca)
 Brześć Kujawski Voivodeship (województwo brzesko-kujawskie, Brześć Kujawski)
 Inowrocław Voivodeship (województwo inowrocławskie, Inowrocław)
 Chełmno Voivodeship (województwo chełmińskie, Chełmno)
 Malbork Voivodeship (województwo malborskie, Malbork)
 Pomeranian Voivodeship (województwo pomorskie, Gdańsk)
 Duchy of Warmia (Księstwo Warmińskie, Lidzbark Warmiński)
 Duchy of Prussia (Księstwo Pruskie, Królewiec)
 Płock Voivodeship (województwo płockie, Płock)
 Rawa Voivodeship (województwo rawskie, Rawa Mazowiecka)
 Masovian Voivodeship (województwo mazowieckie, Warszawa)

Lesser Poland (Małopolska) 
The following is a list of the Voivodeships within Lesser Poland over the period of the mid-16th century until the late 18th century:
 Kraków Voivodeship (województwo krakowskie, Kraków)
 Sandomierz Voivodeship (województwo sandomierskie, Sandomierz)
 Lublin Voivodeship (województwo lubelskie, Lublin)
 Podlaskie Voivodeship (województwo podlaskie, Drohiczyn)
 Ruthenian Voivodeship (województwo ruskie, Lwów [today Lviv, Ukraine])
 Bełz Voivodeship (Bełz [Belz, Ukraine])
 Volhynian Voivodeship (województwo wołyńskie, Łuck [Lutsk, Ukraine])
 Podole Voivodeship (województwo podolskie, Kamieniec Podolski [Kamianets-Podilskyi, Ukraine])
 Bracław Voivodeship (województwo bracławskie, Bracław [Bratslav, Ukraine])
 Kijów Voivodeship (województwo kijowskie, Kijów [Kyiv, Ukraine, or Kiev])
 Czernihów Voivodeship (województwo czernichowskie, Czernihów [Chernihiv, Ukraine])

Grand Duchy of Lithuania 
Voivodeships of the Grand Duchy of Lithuania during the Polish–Lithuanian Commonwealth were based on the administrative structure that existed in the Duchy prior to the Commonwealth's formation, from at least the early-15th century. They were:
 Wilno Voivodship (województwo wileńskie, Wilno [Vilnius, Lithuania])1413
 Troki Voivodship (Troki [Trakai, Lithuania])
 Nowogrodek Voivodship (województwo nowogrodzkie, Nowogródek [Novogrudok, Belarus])
 Brest-Litovsk Voivodship (województwo brzesko-litewskie, Brześć Litewski [Brest, Belarus])
 Minsk Voivodship (województwo mińskie, Mińsk [Minsk, Belarus])
 Mscislaw Voivodship (województwo mścisławskie, Mścisław [Mstsislaw, Belarus])
 Smolensk Voivodship (województwo smoleńskie, Smoleńsk [Smolensk, Russia])
 Vitebsk Voivodship (województwo witebskie, Witebsk [Vitebsk, Belarus])
 Polock Voivodship (województwo połockie, Połock [Polotsk, Belarus])
 Duchy of Samogita (księstwo żmudzkie, Miedniki-Wornie [Varniai, Lithuania])

Duchy of Livonia 
While the Duchy of Livonia was part of the Polish–Lithuanian Commonwealth, approximately 1569–1772, in various periods it comprised the following voivodeships in varying combinations:
 Wenden Voivodship (województwo wendeńskie, Wenden [Cēsis, Latvia]) from 1598 until the 1620s
 Dorpat Voivodship (województwo dorpackie, Dorpat [Tartu, Estonia]) from 1598 until the 1620s
 Parnawa Voivodship (województwo parnawskie, Parnava [Pärnu, Estonia]) from 1598 until the 1620s
 Inflanty Voivodeship (województwo inflanckie Dyneburg [Daugavpils, Latvia]) from the 1620s
 Duchy of Courland and Semigalia (księstwo Kurlandii i Semigalii), Mitawa [Jelgava, Latvia])

Congress Poland 

From 1816 to 1837 there were 8 voivodeships in Congress Poland.

 Augustów Voivodeship
 Kalisz Voivodeship
 Kraków Voivodeship
 Lublin Voivodeship
 Mazowsze Voivodeship
 Płock Voivodeship
 Podlaskie Voivodeship
 Sandomierz Voivodeship

Second Polish Republic 

The administrative division of Poland in the interwar period included 16 voivodeships and Warsaw (with voivodeship rights). The voivodeships that remained in Poland after World War II as a result of Polish–Soviet border agreement of August 1945 were very similar to the current voivodeships.

Collapsed list of car plates since 1937, please use table-sort buttons.

Polish People's Republic 
After World War II, the new administrative division of the country within the new national borders was based on the prewar one and included 14 (+2) voivodeships, then 17 (+5). The voivodeships in the east that had not been annexed by the Soviet Union had their borders left almost unchanged. The newly acquired territories in the west and north were organized into the new voivodeships of Szczecin, Wrocław and Olsztyn, and partly joined to Gdańsk, Katowice and Poznań voivodeships. Two cities were granted voivodeship status: Warsaw and Łódź.

In 1950, new voivodeships were created: Koszalin (previously part of Szczecin), Opole (previously part of Katowice), and Zielona Góra (previously part of Poznań, Wrocław and Szczecin voivodeships). In 1957, three more cities were granted voivodeship status: Wrocław, Kraków and Poznań.

Collapsed list of car plates since 1956 – please use table-sort buttons

Poland's voivodeships 1975–1998

Administrative division of Poland between 1979 and 1998 included 49 voivodeships upheld after the establishment of the Third Polish Republic in 1989 for another decade. This reorganization of administrative division of Poland was mainly a result of local government reform acts of 1973–1975. In place of the three-level administrative division (voivodeship, county, commune), a new two-level administrative division was introduced (49 small voivodeships, and communes). The three smallest voivodeships—Warsaw, Kraków and Łódź—had the special status of municipal voivodeship; the city president (mayor) was also provincial governor.

Collapsed list of Voivodeships: 1975–1998, please use table-sort buttons.

See also

 Armorial of Poland
 Flags of Polish voivodeships
 ISO 3166-2:PL
 List of Polish voivodeships by GRP
 , provinces in Poland
 Polish historical regions

Notes

References 
 "Poland", Encyclopædia Britannica, 15th edition, 2010, Macropaedia, volume 25, p. 937.
 "Poland", The Columbia Encyclopedia, sixth edition, edited by Paul Lagassé, Columbia University Press, 2000, p. 2256.
 "Poland", The Encyclopedia Americana, 1986, volume 22, p. 312.
 "Poland," in Central Intelligence Agency, The CIA World Factbook 2010, New York, Skyhorse Publishing, Inc., 2009, p. 546.
 "Voivodeship," The Oxford English Dictionary, second edition, volume XIX, Oxford, Clarendon Press, 1989, p. 739.

External links 

 Map of Polish Regions 
 Administrative division of Poland (from Commission on Standardization of Geographical Names Outside Poland website, in English) 
 Official map by Head Office of Geodesy and Cartography 
 Regions of Poland 
 Toponymic Guidelines Of Poland for Map Editors and Other Users  Head Office Of Geodesy And Cartography, 2002
 CIA World Factbook --> "Poland --> Administrative divisions"

 
Poland 1
Provinces, Poland
Lists of subdivisions of Poland